Lakenvelder may refer to:

 The Lakenvelder cattle or a.k.a. Dutch Belted, a Dutch cattle breed
 The Lakenvelder or Lakenfelder, a German chicken breed